Saint-Michel-sur-Rhône (literally Saint-Michel on Rhône) is a commune in the Loire department in central France.

Population

See also
Communes of the Loire department

References

Communes of Loire (department)